The canton of Saint-Jean-de-Luz is an administrative division in southern France. Since the French canton reorganisation which came into effect in March 2015, the canton consists of the following 4 communes:
Bidart
Ciboure
Guéthary
Saint-Jean-de-Luz

See also
Cantons of the Pyrénées-Atlantiques department

References

Cantons of Pyrénées-Atlantiques